Edward Tolhurst (29 October 1895 – 24 May 1982) was an Australian cricketer. He played eight first-class cricket matches for Victoria between 1922 and 1931.

See also
 List of Victoria first-class cricketers

References

External links
 

1895 births
1982 deaths
Australian cricketers
Victoria cricketers
Cricketers from Melbourne